"11 Minutes" is a song by English musician Yungblud and American singer-songwriter Halsey, featuring American musician Travis Barker of rock group Blink-182. The song was released by Locomotion Recordings and Geffen Records on 13 February 2019. "11 Minutes" was written by Yungblud, Halsey, Matt Schwartz, and Brynley Rose Plumb. Production was handled by his main collaborator Matt Schwartz as well as Chris Greatti, and Zakk Cervini. An official remix of the song by American DJ Kayzo was also released.

Live performances 
Yungblud, Halsey, and Barker performed "11 Minutes" live at the 2019 iHeartRadio Music Awards. During the performance, Yungblud and Halsey played electric guitars.

Music video 
On February 21, 2019 a music video was released on YouTube showing the 5 stages of grief: denial, anger, bargaining, depression and acceptance. It was directed by music video director and filmmaker Colin Tilley.

Charts

Weekly charts

Year-end charts

Certifications

References

2019 songs
2019 singles
Yungblud songs
Halsey (singer) songs
Travis Barker songs
Geffen Records singles
Songs written by Halsey (singer)
Songs written by Matt Schwartz
Songs written by Yungblud